The 2019–20 Prva A Liga, known as Erste košarkaške lige by sponsorship reasons, is the 14th season of the Montenegrin Basketball League, the top tier basketball league on Montenegro. Mornar is the defending champion.

Competition format
Ten of the twelve teams that play the league join the regular season and play a two-round robin competition where the six first qualified teams join the Super Liga with the two 2019–20 ABA League teams (Budućnost Voli and Mornar). The last qualified team would play a relegation playoff against the second qualified of the Prva B.

Teams

Regular season

League table

Results

Montenegrin clubs in European competitions

References

External links
Montenegrin Basketball Federation official website

Prva A liga seasons
Montenegro
Prva A liga
Montenegro